Montrose Royal Infirmary was a health facility in Bridge Street, Montrose, Angus, Scotland. It was managed by NHS Tayside. It is a Category A listed building.

History
The facility, which was designed by James Collie in the Greek Revival style, opened as the Montrose Infirmary in 1839. It was granted a Royal charter in October 1913. After joining the National Health Service in 1948, it became a community hospital. Following the transfer of services to Ninewells Hospital in Dundee, Montrose Royal Infirmary closed in April 2018.

References

Hospitals in Angus, Scotland
Defunct hospitals in Scotland
Hospitals established in 1839
Hospital buildings completed in 1839
1839 establishments in Scotland
NHS Tayside
Category A listed buildings in Angus, Scotland
Montrose, Angus